Bridget Theresa Prentice ( Corr; born 28 December 1952) is a British politician, who was the Member of Parliament (MP) for Lewisham East from 1992 to 2010. She was married to the Labour MP Gordon Prentice from 1975 until their divorce in 2000. She was a member of the Labour Party until May 2019, when she resigned in protest at Jeremy Corbyn’s leadership.

Background 
Bridget Prentice was born in Glasgow, Scotland, on 28 December 1952. She attended Our Lady and St Francis School, the University of Glasgow (MA English Literature and Modern History 1973), the University of London (PGCE 1974) and South Bank Polytechnic (LLB 1992).

After beginning her working life as the Rector's Assistant at the University of Glasgow (1972–73), she became a history and English teacher at the Roman Catholic London Oratory School in Fulham (1974–86) and later Head of Careers (1984–86), before switching to John Archer School in Wandsworth as Head of Careers between 1986 and 1988.

Member of Parliament
Prentice was an unsuccessful candidate in the 1987 general election, when she stood for Croydon Central. She contested Lewisham East at the 1992 election; its incumbent Conservative MP Colin Moynihan had a majority of 4,814. Prentice gained it for Labour with a majority of 1,095, and increased the majority to 12,127 in 1997. In subsequent general elections she held the seat with reduced majorities of 9,003 in 2001, and 6,751 in 2005.

Appointed a Labour Whip in 1995 by Tony Blair, she continued in the role on Labour entering government in May 1997, before becoming PPS to the Minister for Trade (1998–1999), and then PPS to the Lord Chancellor (1999–2001); she then left government in 2001 to become a member of the Home Affairs Select Committee (2001–2003).

Prentice rejoined the government in 2003, appointed again to the Government Whips' Office. She later became a Parliamentary Under-Secretary of State in the Department for Constitutional Affairs, continuing in the role in the department's successor, the Ministry of Justice.

Within the department, she was responsible for reform of electoral administration, legal services, legal services complaints, legal services commissioner and ombudsman, asylum and immigration, devolution and regional policy. In December 2008, she was reprimanded by the Parliamentary Commissioner for Standards John Lyon, for misusing her communications allowance.

She agreed to pay back the money, which had been spent on sending party political literature to voters who were outside her constituency, but who would join it at the next election as the result of boundary changes.

In April 2009, Prentice announced her decision to stand down from Parliament at the following election. She has close ties to Bonus Pastor Secondary School in Lewisham, accepting one pupil every year for work experience, which included work within the constituency and the Houses of Parliament.

Personal life
Although a Roman Catholic, Prentice has been a Governor at Trinity Church of England All Through School since 2010. In September 2013, she was elected Chair of the Governing Body. She resigned from her membership of the Labour Party in May 2019.

Prentice is a participant in the 2022-23 series of the quiz show Only Connect, in the team "Jugadores".

References

External links
 Bridget Prentice MP official site
 Guardian Unlimited Politics - Ask Aristotle: Bridget Prentice MP
 TheyWorkForYou.com - Voting record of Bridget Prentice MP
 Pupils interview Bridget Prentice about how to get your voice heard for Radiowaves (2008)

1952 births
Living people
Labour Party (UK) MPs for English constituencies
Female members of the Parliament of the United Kingdom for English constituencies
UK MPs 1992–1997
UK MPs 1997–2001
UK MPs 2001–2005
UK MPs 2005–2010
Politicians from Glasgow
Alumni of London South Bank University
20th-century British women politicians
21st-century British women politicians
20th-century English women
20th-century English people
21st-century English women
21st-century English people
Spouses of British politicians